The Virginia Slims Ginny Championships was a tennis tournament held in the United States in 1983 and 1984. It was played on indoor carpet courts and was the final to the preceding eight tournaments of the Ginny Circuit. The winners and finalists of the Ginny Circuit tournaments qualified for the championships. The circuit was aimed at up-and-coming players who were targeting entry into the top-ranks of women's tennis. The first edition of the championships was held in Honolulu, Hawaii and the second in Port St. Lucie, Florida. The total prize money for both editions was $100,000. The tournament ended after two editions because the Ginny Circuit was merged with the 1985 Virginia Slims World Championship Series.

Past finals

Singles

Doubles

See also
List of tennis tournaments

References

External links
 1984 ITF tournament edition details
 1985 ITF tournament edition details

Defunct tennis tournaments in the United States
Carpet court tennis tournaments
WTA Tour
Recurring sporting events established in 1983
Recurring sporting events disestablished in 1984
Tennis tournaments in Hawaii
Tennis tournaments in Florida
1983 establishments in Hawaii
1984 disestablishments in Florida
Port St. Lucie, Florida
Sports in Honolulu